Arthur Goring Thomas (20 November 185020 March 1892) was an English composer.

Life
He was the youngest son of Freeman Thomas and Amelia, daughter of Colonel Thomas Frederick. His elder brothers included Freeman Frederick Thomas, a noted cricketer, who was the father of  Freeman Freeman-Thomas, 1st Marquess of Willingdon, Viceroy of India; and Sir Charles Inigo Thomas.

He was born at Ratton Park, Sussex, and educated at Haileybury College. He was intended for the Civil Service, but delicate health interfered with his studies, and in 1873 he went to Paris to cultivate the musical talent he had displayed from an early age. Here he studied for two years with Émile Durand. In 1875, he returned to England, and in 1877 entered the Royal Academy of Music, where for three years he studied under Ebenezer Prout and Arthur Sullivan, twice winning the Lucas medal for composition. At a later period he received some instruction in orchestration from Max Bruch. His first published composition was a song, Le Roi Henri, which appeared in 1871.

An early comic opera, Don Braggadocio (libretto by his brother, C. I. Thomas), was apparently unfinished; some of the music in it was afterwards used for The Golden Web. A selection from his second opera, The Light of the Harem (libretto by Clifford Harrison), was performed at the Royal Academy of Music on 7 November 1879, with such success that Carl Rosa commissioned him to write Esmeralda (libretto by Theophile Marzials and Alberto Randegger), dedicated to Pauline Viardot, produced at Drury Lane on 26 March 1883. (Creator cast: Georgina Burns (Esmeralda): Barton McGuckin (Phoebus): William Ludwig (Frollo): Leslie Crotty (Quasimodo): Clara Perry (Fleur-de-Lys): Leah Don (Lois): J. H. Stilliard (Chevreuse): Ben Davies (Gringoire): G. H. Snazelle (Clopin).) This contained the very successful aria "O, vision entrancing". Two years later the opera was given (in German) at Cologne and Hamburg, and in 1890 (in French) at Covent Garden.

On 16 April 1885, at Drury Lane, Rosa produced Thomas's fourth and best opera, Nadeshda (libretto by Julian Sturgis); a German version of which was given at Breslau in 1890. A fifth opera, The Golden Web (libretto by Frederick Corder and B. C. Stephenson), an opéra bouffe slighter than its predecessors, was produced (after the composer's death) by the Carl Rosa Opera Company at Liverpool on 15 February, and at the Lyric Theatre, London on 11 March 1893.  
In spite of some positive critical attention, interest in the opera was short-lived.

Besides these dramatic works, Thomas's chief compositions were a psalm, Out of the Deep, for soprano solo and chorus (London, 1878); a choral ode, The Sun Worshippers (Norwich, 1881), and a suite de ballet for orchestra (Cambridge, 1887).  A cantata, The Swan and the Skylark, was found in piano score among his manuscripts after his death: it was orchestrated by Charles Villiers Stanford, and produced at the Birmingham Festival of 1894. 

His minor compositions include over 100 songs and duets. In 1891 Thomas became engaged to be married; shortly afterwards he showed signs of mental disease, and his career came to a tragic end on 20 March 1892 when he committed suicide by throwing himself in front of a train. At the time of his death, Thomas was living at 53, Wimpole Street, Westminster.  He was buried in Finchley Cemetery.

Goring Thomas occupies a distinct place among English composers of the 19th century. His music, which shows traces of his early French training, reveals a great talent for dramatic composition and a real gift of refined and beautiful melody. Personally the most amiable of men, he was most critical of his own work, never attempting anything for which he felt he was unfitted, and constantly revising and rewriting his compositions.

References

;Attribution:

External links
 

English classical composers
English opera composers
Male opera composers
People educated at Haileybury and Imperial Service College
1850 births
1892 deaths
Alumni of the Royal Academy of Music
People from Eastbourne
Suicides by train
Suicides in Westminster
19th-century classical composers
English male classical composers
19th-century English musicians
19th-century British composers
19th-century British male musicians
1890s suicides